Marble Island is one of several uninhabited Canadian arctic islands in Nunavut, Canada, located within western Hudson Bay. The closest community is Rankin Inlet. In the nineteenth century, the island was valued as a harbour for overwintering.

Natural features

Marble Island is composed of a type of sedimentary rock called wacke, laced with quartzite. It is the quartzite that gives the island its white, marble-like appearance.

Marble Island is bare rock, located above the treeline, and with only a small amount of plant life, primarily lichens and mosses. Thus, there is only a limited amount of terrestrial wildlife, primary the polar bear, the Arctic fox, the Arctic hare, and lemmings. A large variety of birds visit the island, including ducks, raptors, and unidentified "small brown birds". A great number of sea mammals can be found nearby, including several kinds of cetaceans (e.g. bowhead whales, orcas, narwhals, and belugas) and seals. Due to the large amount of oceanic life, Marble Island is a traditional summer hunting ground for the Inuit.

Failed expedition

An expedition to find the Northwest Passage was led by James Knight of the Hudson's Bay Company and two ships under captains David Vaughan and George Berley. They were ship-wrecked nearby and took refuge on the island. Despite assistance by the local Inuit, they had all died of starvation and disease, especially scurvy, by 1722 at the latest. In 1769, their remains were finally discovered by Samuel Hearne.

Whaling

Between 1870 and 1887, Marble Island was a popular site for whaleships, but by 1890 was abandoned: few whales could be found nearby, and ice conditions grew treacherous. Before it was abandoned, the whaleship Orray Taft sank nearby: her men occupy several graves on the island. This was a major factor in the creation of the island's nickname, Deadman's Island.

Sacred site

Currently, it is a sacred site of the Inuit: modern visitors are expected to crawl ashore, or die exactly a year later.

References

Further reading
 Bell, Robert. Marble Island and the North-west coast of Hudson's Bay. Charleston:BiblioLife, 2009.

Islands of Hudson Bay
Uninhabited islands of Kivalliq Region